Wigandia caracasana, the Caracus wigandia, is a species of ornamental plant. It is an evergreen that grows to a height of up to 3 metres (10 ft). It has purple flowers in large clusters from spring to autumn.  Some sources treat it as a variety of the species Wigandia urens.  Native to Central America, it is thought to be naturalized in southern California as a garden escape.  It is commonly grown in gardens, and thrives best in a mixture of loam and peat. Cuttings in sand will strike if placed under glass and in heat.

The caracus wigandia can cause severe contact dermatitis.  A substance that it secretes, 2,3-dimethoxy-geranyl- 1,4-benzoquinone (consisting of a quinonoid ring with a 10 or 11 carbon-membered side chain) is a remarkably strong sensitizer, which is found nowhere else in the plant kingdom.  It has been described as approximating an "ideal allergen".

References

Further reading

External links
Wigandia caracasana (in Spanish)

Hydrophylloideae
Flora of Central America